Cholguahue Airport ,  is an airport  east of Los Ángeles, the capital of Bío Bío Province in the Bío Bío Region of Chile.

The runway has an additional  of unpaved overrun on the south end.

See also

Transport in Chile
List of airports in Chile

References

External links
OpenStreetMap - Cholguahue
OurAirports - Cholguahue
FallingRain - Cholguahue Airport

Airports in Biobío Region